Alibaba and the Three Golden Hair is a 2018 Chinese computer-animated adventure comedy film directed by Jiang Yefeng from a screenplay by Liu Fei. A sequel to Alibaba 2: Seal of Solomon (2016), it is the second film in the Alibaba film series. It was released in China on 30 December 2018, and grossed 10.311 million Chinese renminbi ($1,615,511) at the box office.

Release and box office 
Alibaba and the Three Golden Hair was released in China on 30 December 2018. In its opening week, it grossed 2.998 million Chinese renminbi ($469,714) at the box office, reaching 10.311 million ($1,615,511) by the end of its theatrical run from 270,800 tickets sold.

References

External links 
Alibaba and the Three Golden Hair at Douban (in Mandarin)

2018 films
2018 computer-animated films
2018 comedy films
2010s adventure comedy films
2010s children's animated films
Chinese children's films
Chinese comedy films
Chinese computer-animated films